Pay as You Enter is a 1928 American comedy film directed by Lloyd Bacon and starring Louise Fazenda, Clyde Cook and William Demarest.

Cast
 Louise Fazenda as Mary Smith  
 Clyde Cook as Clyde Jones  
 William Demarest as 'Terrible Bill' McGovern  
 Myrna Loy as Yvonne De Russo

Box office
According to Warner Bros records the film earned $101,000 domestic and $38,000 foreign.

Preservation status
The film is now lost.

References

External links
 

1928 films
1928 comedy films
1920s English-language films
Silent American comedy films
Films directed by Lloyd Bacon
Warner Bros. films
American black-and-white films
Lost American films
Lost comedy films
American silent feature films
1928 lost films
1920s American films